An H.323 Gatekeeper serves the purpose of Call Admission Control and translation services from E.164 IDs (commonly a phone number) to IP addresses in an H.323 telephony network.  Gatekeepers can be combined with a gateway function to proxy H.323 calls and are sometimes referred to as Session Border Controllers. A gatekeeper can also deny access or limit the number of simultaneous connections to prevent network congestion.

H.323 endpoints are not required to register with a gatekeeper to be able to place point to point calls, but they are essential for any serious H.323 network to control call prefix routing and link capacities among other functions.

A typical H.323 Gatekeeper call flow for a successful call may look like:-
    
    | |                           |  |
 Endpoint A                    Endpoint B
   1234                           1123

 Endpoint A dials 1123 from the system.
 Endpoint A sends ARQ (Admission Request) to the Gatekeeper.
 Gatekeeper returns ACF (Admission Confirmation) with IP address of endpoint B.
 Endpoint A sends Q.931 call setup messages to endpoint B.
 Endpoint B sends the Gatekeeper an ARQ, asking if it can answer call.
 Gatekeeper returns an ACF with IP address of endpoint A.
 Endpoint B answers and sends Q.931 call setup messages to endpoint A.
 IRR sent to Gatekeeper from both endpoints.
 Either endpoint disconnects the call by sending a DRQ (Disconnect Request) to the Gatekeeper.
 Gatekeeper sends a DCF (Disconnect Confirmation) to both endpoints.

The gatekeeper allows calls to be placed either:
Directly between endpoints (Direct Endpoint Model), or
Route the call signaling through itself (Gatekeeper Routed Model).

See also

 GNU Gatekeeper (GnuGK)

Sources 
 Cisco Technotes: Understanding H.323 Gatekeepers
 Microsoft TechNet: H.323 Gatekeeper
 Packetizer: A Primer on the H.323 Series Standard

ITU-T recommendations
Videotelephony